Fanelo Order Mamba (born 29 October 2001) is a Liswati footballer.

Career

Club 
Mamba began his senior career 2015 at Moneni Pirates F.C. and was first time in October 2015 named as Player of the Month, in the MTN Premier League. The forward left on 21 October 2018 Moneni Pirates F.C., to sign for League rival Young Buffaloes.

International 
Mamba was first called in September 2018 to Eswatini national football team and played his debut on 09 September 2018.

Career statistics

International

International goals
Scores and results list eSwanti's goal tally first.

References

External links
 
 

2001 births
Living people
Swazi footballers
Eswatini international footballers
Association football forwards
Moneni Pirates F.C. players
Young Buffaloes F.C. players